Valea lui Ivan River (lit. Valley of the Ivan River) may refer to:

 Valea lui Ivan, a tributary of the Dâmbovița in Argeș County
 Valea lui Ivan, a tributary of the Sadu in Sibiu County

See also 
 Ivan River